Lawrence Paul Bachmann (December 12, 1911 - September 7, 2004) was an American film producer and executive who settled for a time in the United Kingdom.

Biography
Bachmann was born in New York City, where his father, J.G. Bachmann, worked at Paramount with B.P. Schulberg in the 1920s. He gained employment in the motion picture industry aged 16, beginning as an assistant film editor at Universal. He graduated with a bachelor's degree from University of South Carolina (USC) and then a master's degree at Oxford University in the UK. After his period of formal education, he became an assistant to Pandro S. Berman, who was then head of production at RKO. He switched to MGM to work for J.J. Cohn, head of the B-picture unit writing screenplays and becoming a producer.

During World War II, Bachmann served in the U.S. Army Air Forces and was the principal overseas correspondent for Air Force magazine. After the war, he worked in Berlin as head of films for the US State Department, then lived in France and Italy.

Bachmann moved to the UK where he became head of production for Paramount's British subsidiary. He then performed a similar function for MGM, joining the studio in 1959. He ran MGM British for some years. Among other films he supervised the four Miss Marple films featuring Margaret Rutherford in the lead role.

After becoming an independent producer, Bachmann was interviewed by The New York Times in 1982. According to Bachmann, "You don't need a huge organization" or "wastefully high budgets. All you need is a good story, the right attack, and the determination to make a movie for a reasonable price."

Bachmann died at the Motion Picture Country Home and Hospital in Woodland Hills, Los Angeles on September 7, 2004.

Credits
Jalna (1935) - writer
Speed (1936) - story
They Wanted to Marry (1937) - story
The People vs. Dr. Kildare (1941) - stry
Dr. Kildare's Wedding Day (1941) - story
Calling Dr. Gillespie (1942) - writer (uncredited)
Fingers at the Window (1942) - writer
Dr. Gillespie's New Assistant (1942) - writer
Dr. Gillespie's Criminal Case (1943) - writer
Shadow on the Wall (1950) - story "Death in a Doll's House"
The Devil Makes Three (1952) - story
Whirlpool (1959) - writer, original novel "The Lorelai"
Ten Seconds to Hell (1959) - original novel "The Phoenix"
Village of the Damned (1960) - head of MGM British
Murder, She Said (1961) - head of MGM British
The Green Helmet (1961) - head of MGM British
Kill or Cure (1962) - executive producer
In the Cool of the Day (1962) - head of MGM British
The Password is Courage (1962) - head of MGM British
Cairo (1963) - executive producer
The Friendliest Girls in the World (1963) -head of MGM British
The Haunting (1963) - head of MGM British
Follow the Boys (1963) - story, producer
Murder at the Gallop (1963) - producer (uncredited)
Children of the Damned (1964) - executive producer
Night Must Fall (1964) - executive producer
Murder Most Foul (1964) - executive producer
Zero One (1962–65) (TV series) - producer
The Alphabet Murders (1966) - producer
Whose Life Is It Anyway? (1981) - producer

References

American film producers
American male screenwriters
Film producers from New York (state)
Screenwriters from New York (state)
Writers from New York City
United States Army Air Forces personnel of World War II
1911 births
2004 deaths
20th-century American male writers
20th-century American screenwriters